Beryl Marshall (26 November 1929 – 21 January 2015) was an Argentine swimmer who competed at the 1948 Summer Olympics. She competed in the women's 100 metre backstroke event and she reached the semi-final where she did not qualify to compete in the final.

References

Swimmers at the 1948 Summer Olympics
Olympic swimmers of Argentina
Argentine people of British descent
Argentine female backstroke swimmers
1929 births
2015 deaths